Demirli may refer to:

Dəmirli, a village in Nagorno-Karabakh, Azerbaijan
Demirli, Atkaracalar
Demirli, Babadağ
Demirli, Bucak, Turkey
Demirli, Ergani
Demirli, İhsaniye, a village in Afyonkarahisar Province, Turkey
Demirli, Kulp
the former name of Stavros, Larissa, a village in Thessaly, Greece
the former name of Palaiofarsalos railway station in Thessaly, Greece